Antoine  may refer to:

 Antoine, a masculine given name
 Antoine (automobile), a Belgian automobile manufactured by Victor Antoine
 Antoine (film), as 2008 Canadian documentary film directed by Laura Bari. 
 Antoine, is a French pop singer, and also a sailor, adventurer, writer, photographer, and filmmaker.

See also

 Antonio (disambiguation)
 Saint-Antoine (disambiguation)
Sant'Antonio (disambiguation)
San Antonio (disambiguation)
Santo Antonio (disambiguation)
Anthony (disambiguation)